Stewart McKenny is an Australian comic book artist, who has been described as "one of Australia's most prolifically published comic book artists".

Career
McKenny has worked on Star Wars comics, including Star Wars: Clone Wars Adventures, as well as working with Eddie Campbell on Captain America. He is currently working for DC on the new children's title, Super Friends.

McKenny’s British small press work includes contributions to FutureQuake.   His cover for FutureQuake #6 was featured in a full-page reprint in the Judge Dredd Megazine (Feb 2006).  In Australia, he has contributed to Zero Assassin, Tango Quattro, Pop Culture & Two Minute Noodles, Rex Hellwig and The Watch.

Bibliography
Comics work includes:

Rex Hellwig #1 (Black Cat Comics, 2000)
Star Wars: Clone Wars Adventures (Dark Horse Comics):
 "Heroes on Both Sides" (with Chris Avellone, in Clone Wars Adventures Volume 5, 2005)
 "The Drop" (with Mike Kennedy, in Clone Wars Adventures Volume 6, 2006)
 "Spy Girls" (with Ryan Kaufman, in Clone Wars Adventures Volume 7, 2007)
 "Graduation Day" (with Chris Avellone, in Clone Wars Adventures Volume 10, 2007)
 "Being Boba Fett" (with Jason Hall, in Star Wars Tales 18, 2003)
Captain America: "Requiem" #27-28 (inks, with writer Robert Morales and pencils by Eddie Campbell, Marvel Comics, 2004)
The Watch: Casus Belli (Phosphorescent Comics, 2005)
 "Strip!" (with James MacKay, in FutureQuake #4, May 2005)
 "Triumph of the Will" (with writers Edward Berridge/Richmond Clements and graytones by Andy Finlayson, FutureQuake #6, May 2007)
Super Friends #3, 5, 8, 12, 17, 21, 23, 26 and 29 (with writer Sholly Fisch and inks by Phillip Moy / Dan Davis, DC Comics, 2008–2010)

Notes

References

Stewart McKenny at Dark Horse

Australian comics artists
Year of birth missing (living people)
Living people